Gillingham railway station is in Gillingham, Dorset, England. Today it is managed by South Western Railway. The main offices, designed by Sir William Tite, stand on the north side of the line.

It is commonly suffixed as Gillingham (Dorset) to distinguish it from the station of the same name in Kent.

History

On 3 April 1856 Miss Seymour, sister of the company’s chairman, dug the first ceremonial sod for the Salisbury and Yeovil Railway (S&YR) at Gillingham. Three years later, on 2 May 1859, the railway from  opened to Gillingham, and was completed to  station at Yeovil on 1 June 1860. The station was close to the town centre.  The main offices and goods shed were on the north side of the line, further sidings to serve a brickworks were added on the other side of the line, and a signal box opened in 1875. Trains were provided for the S&YR by the London and South Western Railway (LSWR), which bought out the smaller company in 1878. In the twentieth century the LSWR operated motor bus services from Gillingham station to Mere, Zeals and Shaftesbury.

In 1923 the LSWR became part of the Southern Railway, which in turn was nationalised in 1948 to become the Southern Region of British Railways. A new signal box was opened on 28 April 1957, but on 5 April 1965 public goods services were withdrawn. Three years later a fertiliser distribution depot was opened in the old goods yard (it closed in 1993). The line had been transferred to the Western Region in 1963, and through trains beyond  were soon diverted along other routes. The line was reduced to just a single track on 1 April 1967 with a passing loop retained at Gillingham. The former signal box (now reduced to ground frame status following the 2012 resignalling) is at the west end of the station by the end of this platform.

Platform layout
The track serving the northern platform is signalled for trains to run in either direction so most trains use this platform unless two need to pass. The southern platform, which is reached by a footbridge, is then used for the westbound train.

Services

South Western Railway operate hourly services between London Waterloo and Exeter St Davids.

See also

 Southern Railway routes west of Salisbury

References

Railway stations in Dorset
DfT Category D stations
Former London and South Western Railway stations
Railway stations in Great Britain opened in 1859
Railway stations served by South Western Railway
William Tite railway stations
Gillingham, Dorset